Vincetoxicum woollsii is a small vine in the family Apocynaceae, belonging to the genus Vincetoxicum. It is a rare plant found in New South Wales and Queensland. It was declared endangered by the Nature Conservation Act of 1992.

References

Flora of New South Wales
Flora of Queensland
woollsii
Vines